Samarium(II) bromide is an inorganic compound with the chemical formula . It is a brown solid that is insoluble in most solvents but degrades readily in air.

Structure
In the gas phase,  is a bent molecule with Sm–Br distance 274.5 pm and bond angle 131±6°.

History
Samarium(II) bromide was first synthesized in 1934 by P. W. Selwood, when he reduced samarium tribromide (SmBr3) with hydrogen (H2). Kagan also synthesized it by converting samarium(III) oxide (Sm2O3) to SmBr3 and then reducing with a lithium dispersion in THF. Robert A. Flowers synthesized it by adding two equivalent of lithium bromide (LiBr) to samarium diiodide (SmI2) in tetrahydrofuran. Namy managed to synthesize it by mixing tetrabromoethane (C2H2Br4) with samarium metal, and Hilmerson found that heating the tetrabromoethane or samarium greatly improved the production of samarium(II) bromide.

Reactions
Samarium(II) bromide has reducing properties reminiscent of the more commonly used samarium diiodide. It is an effective for pinacol homocouplings of aldehydes, ketones, and cross-coupling carbonyl compounds. Reports have shown that samarium(II) bromide is capable of selectively reducing ketones if it is in the presence of an alkyl halide. 

Samarium(II) bromide forms soluble adducts with hexamethylphosphoramide. This species reduces imines to amines and alkyl chlorides to hydrocarbons. For example, SmBr2(hmpa)x converts  cyclohexyl chloride to cyclohexane.

Samarium(II) bromide will reduce ketones in tetrahydrofuran if an activator is absent.

References

Bromides
Samarium compounds
Reducing agents
Lanthanide halides